How to Dance in Ohio is a 2015 American documentary film directed by Alexandra Shiva. The film follows a group of autistic young adults in Columbus, Ohio preparing for their first spring formal. With guidance from their group counselor, Dr. Emilio Amigo, the group spends 12 weeks practicing their social skills in preparation for the dance. HBO Documentary Films acquired television rights to the film eleven days before its world premiere at the 2015 Sundance Film Festival. The film premiered on HBO on October 26, 2015. Three young women are the main subjects of the documentary.

Shiva said of the film: "The dance is sweet and the dance is lovely, but the biggest challenge is how do we show you as a viewer that for Marideth to just say 'Hi,' that's an accomplishment?"

Main participants

Marideth
Marideth Bridges is a 16-year-old who spends most of her time at home on her computer learning facts.

Jessica
Jessica Sullivan is a 22-year-old living at home with her parents. She works at a bakery with an autistic workforce. Her best friend is Caroline.

Caroline
Caroline McKenzie is a 19-year-old college student. She has a boyfriend who she met at Dr. Emilio Amigo's family counseling center and is best friends with Jessica.

Reception
A reviewer for The Hollywood Reporter described the film as "touching"; remarking, "Compared to other documentaries about the condition, it's heartening to see one that accentuates the positive so much, showing families where the parents have managed to keep their marriages intact, where no one gets bullied, no one is a savant, and there's no mention of the debate around vaccines."

Musical adaptation
In January 2018, Playbill reported that a musical based on the documentary was in development, with music by Jacob Yandura and book and lyrics by Rebekah Greer Melocik. The production was to be directed by longtime Broadway producer Harold Prince, who also served as a dramaturge on earlier drafts of the play. Upon Prince's death in 2019, Sammi Cannold took over as director. The musical's world premiere production at Syracuse Stage was announced in June 2022, featuring seven autistic actors playing characters inspired by the documentary participants and Wilson Jermaine Heredia in the role of Emilio Amigo.

References

External links
Official website

2015 documentary films
2015 films
Documentary films about autism
HBO documentary films
Blumhouse Productions films
Films shot in Ohio
Documentary films about Ohio
2010s English-language films
2010s American films
Films about disability